Fitore is a village of about 300 people in Korçë County, Albania. It is part of the former municipality Miras. At the 2015 local government reform it became part of the municipality Devoll. Most of the families are farmers and they keep livestock such as cows, sheep, chickens, rabbits etc. Horses are used mainly to carry stuff around the fields, from and to the village. Horses are used also to bring hardwoods from mountain that is used for wood-burning appliances. Some families keep dogs and cats as domestic animals. The village is also known by its old name Shënkollas (Saint Nicholas), which was changed after WWII and religious names were banned from use. There is an elementary school and a high school where students from Dobranj, Bracanj, Fitore, Zicisht, Poncare, Menkulas, Zicisht, Sul and Koshnice go to.

References

Populated places in Devoll (municipality)
Villages in Korçë County